Sunderby SK is a Swedish football club located in Södra Sunderbyn.

Background
Sunderby SK currently plays in Division 4 Norrbotten Södra which is the sixth tier of Swedish football. They play their home matches at the Byvallen in Södra Sunderbyn.

The club is affiliated to Norrbottens Fotbollförbund.

Season to season

Footnotes

External links
 Sunderby SK – Official website
 Sunderby SK on Facebook

Sport in Norrbotten County
Football clubs in Norrbotten County